Agnes Digital (foaled  May 15, 1997 – December 8, 2021) is an American born Japan-based Thoroughbred racehorse and the winner of several notable Grade 1 races, including the 2001 Tenno Sho (Autumn), the 2001 Hong Kong Cup, and the 2003 Yasuda Kinen.

Career

Agnes Digital's first race was on September 12th, 1999, where he came in 2nd at Hanshin Racecourse. He picked up his first win at the same course on October 2nd.

He won his first graded race, by winning the Zen-Nippon Sansai Yushun on December 23rd, 1999. He then began competing in only stakes races and graded races. 

He won his next graded race on June 14th, 2000, by winning the Nagoya Yushun. He then picked up two big wins to close the year - the September 30th, 2000, Unicorn Stakes and the November 19th, 2000, international Mile Championship.

He went on a five win streak starting in September 2001. He won the Nihon TV Hai, the Mile Championship Nambu Hai, the Autumn Tenno Sho, then the Hong Kong Cup and the February Stakes. The win streak ended with a 6th place finish at the 2002 Dubai World Cup. 

His next win would be the last win of his career, as he captured the 2003 Yasuda Kinen. He tried to reclaim both the 2003 edition of the Mile Championship Nambu Hai and the 2003 edition of the Tenno Sho Autumn, but was unsuccessful. His last race was on December 28th, 2003 at the Arima Kinen.

Stud career
Agnes Digital's descendants include:

c = colt, f = filly

Pedigree

References

1997 racehorse births
Racehorses bred in Kentucky
Racehorses trained in Japan
Thoroughbred family 22-d
2021 racehorse deaths